Leonard Richardson Cutter (July 1, 1825 – July 13, 1894), Chairman of the Board of Aldermen of Boston, Massachusetts, ascended (pursuant to Section 29 of the municipal charter) on November 29, 1873 to the office of acting mayor, with all the powers of mayor except that he did not have mayoral veto authority. Cutter served out the term of Henry L. Pierce after Pierce resigned to serve in Congress.

See also
 Timeline of Boston, 1870s

References

Further reading
 

Mayors of Boston
1825 births
1894 deaths
Massachusetts city council members
19th-century American people
People from Jaffrey, New Hampshire
Massachusetts Democrats
Harvard University alumni
19th-century American politicians